Sideling may refer to:

In the United States:
Sideling Hill, part of the Allegheny Mountains
Sideling Hill Creek (Aughwick Creek), a tributary of Aughwick Creek
Sideling Hill Creek (Potomac River), a tributary of the Potomac River
Sideling Hill Tunnel, one of three original Pennsylvania Turnpike tunnels
Sideling Hill Wildlife Management Area, Maryland
Sideling Lock, one of several Locks on the C&O Canal

In Australia:
Sideling Range, Tasmania
Narangba railway station, Brisbane, previously known as Sideling Creek Station

Other:
SS Sideling Hill, a ship
Sideling, a geologic feature